Serbian Uprising can refer to:

 Serbian Uprising of 1594 (in Banat)
 Serbian Uprising of 1596 (in Herzegovina)
 Serbian Uprising of 1737 (in Raška)
 Serbian Uprising of 1788 (in Pomoravlje)
 Serbian Uprising of 1804 (in central Serbia)
 Serbian Uprising of 1814 (in Šumadija)
 Serbian Uprising of 1815 (in central Serbia)
 Serbian Uprising of 1834 (in Bosnia)
 Serbian Uprising of 1841 (in the region of Niš)
 Serbian Uprising of 1848 (in Vojvodina)
 Serbian Uprising of 1875 (in Herzegovina, Bosnia, and Raška)
 Serbian Uprising of 1917 (in Toplica)
 Serbian Uprising of 1941 (in Serbia and other parts of Yugoslavia)

See also
 Serbian-Bulgarian War (disambiguation)
 Serbian-Turkish War (disambiguation)
 Uprising in Bosnia and Herzegovina (disambiguation)